Donth is a surname. Notable people with the surname include:

 František Donth (or Franz Donth) (1904–?), Czech Ethnic German Nordic skier
 Michael Donth (born 1967), German politician